Wanda Jackson Salutes the Country Music Hall of Fame is a studio album by American recording artist Wanda Jackson. It was released in September 1966 via Capitol Records and contained 12 tracks. The album was a collection of cover songs recorded by country artists that have been inducted into the Country Music Hall of Fame and Museum. It was the ninth studio release of Jackson's career and the second to reach a charting position on the American country survey.

Background
Wanda Jackson transitioned back to the country music market following several years of making Rockabilly recordings for the Capitol label. She saw commercial success with the country songs like 1961's "Right or Wrong" and "In the Middle of a Heartache". Through the remainder of the decade she became prolific in the country field with albums and singles. Wanda Jackson Salutes the Country Music Hall of Fame was another project focused towards this audience. The album was made as a tribute to Jackson's favorite performers who had been inducted into the Country Music Hall of Fame and Museum. "So in recording this album, we are offering a grateful salute to these five performing pioneers of country music," Jackson wrote in the liner notes.

Content and recording
The project consisted of 12 tracks in total and were composed by other performers. As stated in the liner notes, Jackson chose songs from five Hall of Fame performers to include on the album. She chose Roy Acuff, Ernest Tubb, Tex Ritter, Jimmie Rodgers and Hank Williams. Covers included "Jambalaya (On the Bayou)", Wabash Cannonball" and "Soldier's Last Letter". The album was recorded in July 1966 at Capitol Studios located in Hollywood, California. The album was produced by Ken Nelson.

Release and reception

Wanda Jackson Salutes the Country Music Hall of Fame was released in July 1966 on Capitol Records. The album was Jackson's ninth studio recording of her career. It was originally distributed as a vinyl LP, containing six tracks on either side of the record. The record was Jackson's second to reach a charting position on the Billboard Top Country Albums survey, peaking at number 12 after spending ten weeks there. It received a three-star rating from AllMusic in later years. Three decades following its original release, Jackson donated the guitar featured on the album's cover to the Country Music Hall of Fame and Museum.

Track listing

Chart performance

Release history

References

1966 albums
Albums produced by Ken Nelson (United States record producer)
Capitol Records albums
Wanda Jackson albums
Covers albums
Albums recorded at Capitol Studios
Country Music Hall of Fame and Museum